Richard Brinkley (probably died 1525) was the Provincial Master of the Franciscans in England in June 1524. He was based in Cambridge.

References 

Year of birth missing
1520s deaths
English Franciscans
People from Cambridge
16th-century English people